Bill Sorvino (born February 15) is an American stage and screen actor, writer and producer. He attended William Esper Studio. Sorvino's acting has been recognized on regional and national levels. Most Notably the Accolade Global Film Competition Named one of 50 most influential people in Hudson County by the Hudson Reporter in 2012 and 2013. He is also the founder of the Golden Door International Film Festival in Jersey City.

Filmography

References

External links

American male stage actors
Living people
Year of birth missing (living people)
Place of birth missing (living people)
Male actors from Jersey City, New Jersey
American male film actors